The Huangxi Academy is a former academy in Dadu District, Taichung, Taiwan.

History
The building was originally built in 1888 as an extended building to the existing Wenchang Temple. The building was closed during the Japanese rule of Taiwan. After the handover of Taiwan from Japan to the Republic of China in 1945, the building was sold and many of its objects were stolen. In 1984, an architect and scholar Han Pao-teh completed the research on the academy and begun the restoration of the building.

Architecture
The building was built with late Qing Dynasty architecture of traditional southern Fujian style. Its roof has five sections and six wallow tails.

Transportation
The building is accessible within walking distance south west of Dadu Station of Taiwan Railways.

See also
 List of tourist attractions in Taiwan

References

1888 establishments in China
Academies in Taiwan
Buildings and structures in Taichung
Tourist attractions in Taichung